David Dondero (born 24 June 1969 in Duluth, Minnesota, United States) is an American singer-songwriter and guitarist. In 2006, NPR's All Songs Considered named David one of the "best living songwriters" alongside Bob Dylan, Paul McCartney and Tom Waits.

Music career 
Dondero started his musical career on drums at the age of 9, due in part to the fact that he "was always drumming on stuff with my hands". Dondero released four records with the Clemson, SC-based punk/hardcore band Sunbrain (three on Grass Records and one on Ghostmeat Records), before breaking up in 1995. The following year, Dondero joined This Bike Is A Pipe Bomb for nearly two years as their drummer. He left in 1998 to focus on his solo material. He has since released seven solo albums – two with Ghostmeat Records, three with Future Farmer Records and the most recent two with Team Love Records. His eighth album, titled # Zero with a Bullet, was released on 3 August 2010.

Dondero has toured with such acts as Crooked Fingers, Jolie Holland, Against Me!, The Mountain Goats, David Bazan, Preston School of Industry, Bright Eyes, Tilly and the Wall, Erik Petersen of Mischief Brew, Spoon, and Willy Mason.

Discography

Albums 
 The Pity Party – (1999 · Ghostmeat Records)
 Spider West Myshkin and a City Bus (out of print) – (2000 · Ghostmeat Records)
 Shooting at the Sun with a Water Gun – (2000 · Future Farmer Records)
 The Transient –  (2002 · Future Farmer Records)
 Spider West Myshkin and a City Bus (re-issue) – (2003 · Ghostmeat Records)
 Live at the Hemlock – (2004 · Future Farmer Records)
 South of the South – (2005 · Team Love)
 Simple Love – (2007 · Team Love)
 # Zero with a Bullet – (2010 · Team Love)
 A Pre-existing Condition – (2011 · Ghostmeat Records)
 This Guitar – (2013)
 Golden Hits vol. 1 – (2013)
 Inside the Cats Eye – (2017)
 The Filter Bubble Blues – (2020)

Splits
David Dondero/Chris Terry – (2003 · Perpetual Motion Machine)
David Dondero/Mischief Brew – "Two Boxcars" (2005 · Fistolo Records)
David Dondero/Pine Hill Haints; Arkam Records

Compilations
Ghostmeat 5th Anniversary 1994–1999 (song: "Leave the Driving to Them")
Parts – Ghostmeat Records Compilation (as part of the band: sunbrain. Song: "Something Wrong")

References

External links
David Dondero official website
Team Love Records
David Dondero at NPR Music
The Best Living Songwriters (NPR article)
David Dondero performs and is interviewed on Radio Happy Hour

American male singer-songwriters
American folk singers
1969 births
Musicians from Duluth, Minnesota
American people of Italian descent
Living people
Team Love Records artists
Singer-songwriters from Minnesota